Bob Bryan and Mike Bryan were the defending champions, but lost in the semifinals to Agustín Calleri and Fernando González.

Agustín Calleri and Fernando González won in the final 7–5, 7–5, against Stephen Huss and Wesley Moodie.

Seeds

Draw

Draw

External links
Draw

Doubles